Olena Bilosiuk, née Olena Pidhrushna (Olena Myxajlivna Pidhrušna; born 9 January 1987) is a Ukrainian biathlete. She is Olympic and World champion and multiple medalist in different high-level competitions. Pidhrushna is considered one of Ukraine's most successful winter sports athletes. She lives in Ternopil.

Career
Her first international competition was 2005 European Youth Olympic Winter Festival in Monthey, Switzerland, where she won two bronze medals, and 2005 Biathlon Junior World Championships in Kontiolahti, Finland. Next season she missed internationally, but on 2 March 2007, she debuted in Biathlon World Cup by finishing 44th in sprint in Lahti, Finland. She was enrolled in the national team for all three last World Cup stages that season but didn't gain any points. She didn't get a quota in the national team in 2007–08 season. That time she spent competing at Biathlon European Championships and junior competitions.

In 2008–09 season, she took part regularly in the relay team, and on 7 January 2009, she was in the winning relay team in German Oberhof. 

She represented Ukraine at the 2010 Winter Olympics in Vancouver. Her best result at that Games was rank 12 in mass start.

2012–13 season became one of her most successful. In the first sprint race of that season on 1 December 2012, Olena finished third in Östersund, Sweden, and was second in pursuit in Italian Antholz-Anterselva in January 2013. Later on, Pidhrushna took a hat-trick of medals at the 2013 Biathlon World Championships, where she won the gold in the sprint, was part of the women's relay team which won silver, and secured a bronze in the pursuit. For these achievements, she was named Ukraine's best sportswoman of 2013. That season she ended ranking 8th in World Cup general classification.

2013–14 season started for her quite successfully, with one podium in January. Together with Juliya Dzhyma, Valj Semerenko and Vita Semerenko, she won the gold medal in the Women's relay at the 2014 Winter Olympics, in Sochi, Russia. Pidhrushna took a break in her sports career at the end of the 2013–14 season and was subsequently appointed Deputy Minister of Youth and Sports in the Ukrainian government. On 30 November 2014, she gave an interview for biathlon.com.ua, stating: "I took break in my sport career for a decree only. I can't do anything before the time the child will be born... so I must do something... I want fans to understand my decision and wait. I hope to be back in future, after the child will be born..." So she returned in November 2015. Her attempts to have a child were then unsuccessful. Later she divorced her husband.

She returned in 2015–16 season, which she started with two bronze medals in sprint and individual race in Swedish Östersund. In mid-February she won sprint in Canmore, Canada. That year she achieved her best World Cup ranking – 7. Next season Pidhrushna didn't have plenty of good results, and she missed all races in March.

She qualified to represent Ukraine at the 2018 Winter Olympics. Pidhrushna carried the Ukrainian flag during the opening ceremony of the 2018 Winter Olympics. Due to poor physical conditions, she didn't compete in any race.

Biathlon results

Olympic Games
1 medal (1 gold)

World Championships
5 medals (1 gold, 2 silver, 3 bronze)

World Cup

Individual podiums

Relay podiums

Rankings

Personal life
Olena was born in Legnica, Poland, but she spent her childhood in Velyka Berezovytsia near Ternopil, Ukraine. Her family had to move because her father was a military officer.

She graduated from Ternopil Volodymyr Hnatyuk National Pedagogical University, where she studied physical training and sports. Now she is a Ph.D. student at Lviv State University of Physical Culture.

Pidhrushna married Oleksiy Kayda on 26 May 2013. Kayda is a member of Verkhovna Rada (Ukraine's parliament) for the party Svoboda. According to Pidhrushna her husband was attacked in December 2013 by "provocateurs" during the Euromaidan demonstrations. In October 2016 she declared that they divorced.

During the awarding ceremony after her victory in the women's relay in Hochfilzen on 8 December 2013, she and other Ukrainian biathletes shouted "For Maidan". Pidhrushna gained at a news conference after her women's relay victory at the 2014 Winter Olympics a minute's silence in memory of the people who died in Kyiv in the February 2014 Euromaidan riots.

References

External links

1987 births
Living people
People from Legnica
Dynamo sports society athletes
Ukrainian female biathletes
Biathletes at the 2010 Winter Olympics
Biathletes at the 2014 Winter Olympics
Biathletes at the 2022 Winter Olympics
Olympic biathletes of Ukraine
Medalists at the 2014 Winter Olympics
Olympic medalists in biathlon
Olympic gold medalists for Ukraine
Biathlon World Championships medalists
Ukrainian sportsperson-politicians
21st-century Ukrainian women politicians
Laureates of the Prize of the Cabinet of Ministers of Ukraine for special achievements of youth in the development of Ukraine